The 1999 Davis Cup World Group Qualifying Round was held from 24 to 26 September. They were the main play-offs of the 1999 Davis Cup. The winners of the playoffs advanced to the 2000 Davis Cup World Group, and the losers were relegated to their respective Zonal Regions I.

Teams
Bold indicates team had qualified for the 2000 Davis Cup World Group.

From World Group

 
 
 
 
 
 
 
 

 From Americas Group I

 
 

 From Asia/Oceania Group I

 
 

 From Europe/Africa Group I

Results summary
Date: 24–26 September

The eight losing teams in the World Group first round ties and eight winners of the Zonal Group I final round ties competed in the World Group Qualifying Round for spots in the 2000 World Group.

  are promoted to the World Group in 2000.
  are relegated to Zonal Group I in 2000.

Qualifying results

Austria vs. Sweden

Zimbabwe vs. Chile

Uzbekistan vs. Czech Republic

Ecuador vs. Netherlands

New Zealand vs. Spain

Italy vs. Finland

Great Britain vs. South Africa

Romania vs. Germany

References

External links
Davis Cup official website

World Group Qualifying Round